The 1929–31 Balkan Cup was the competition's first edition. Four teams participated: Romania, Greece, Yugoslavia, and Bulgaria. Romania won the trophy ahead of second placed Yugoslavia. Greece came third and Bulgaria was last. The best goalscorers were Bodola and Wetzer, both from Romania and with 7 goals each. Albania had registered for the tournament, but retired before the beginning and did not participate.

Standings

Matches

Winner

Statistics

Goalscorers

References 

1929-31
1929–30 in European football
1930–31 in European football
1929–30 in Romanian football
1930–31 in Romanian football
1929–30 in Bulgarian football
1930–31 in Bulgarian football
1929–30 in Greek football
1930–31 in Greek football
1929–30 in Yugoslav football
1930–31 in Yugoslav football